Nancy Wrights Corner is an unincorporated community in Caroline County, in the U.S. state of Virginia. It is located along US 1 and VSR 605, west of Woodford. The community was one of the sites of the Battle of North Anna.

References

External links

Unincorporated communities in Virginia
Unincorporated communities in Caroline County, Virginia